The Holy Rosary Minor Seminary is the oldest Christian higher educational institute for the clergy in the Philippines  established in Naga City, Camarines Sur, in the early part of the 18th century. At present, it houses 114 seminarian interns and 16 extern seminarians from the Diocese of Libmanan. From its reopening in the year 2013 after its closure during the 1980s, accepts Junior High School (Grade 7 to 10) and Senior High School (Grade 11 to 12) enrollment in adherence to the K-12 Program of the Department of Education.

Administration
The Seminary administration consists of the following priests:
 Rector: Rev. Fr. Francis A. Tordilla (since 2022)
 Vice-Rector: Rev. Fr. Ace D. Baracena (since 2020)
 Prefect of Discipline: Rev. Fr. Ace D. Baracena (since 2016)
 Spiritual Directors: Rev. Fr. Roy S. Guerina (since June 2018, Prefect of Discipline, 2017), Rev. Fr. Enrico Julian N. Paglinawan (since 2013, left 2016, returned August 2018), Rev. Fr. Jay S. Aguilar (since 2014), and Rev. Fr. Jed Anthony F. Pena (since June 2018)

Alumni
The Holy Rosary Seminary, a Roman Catholic seminary run by the Archdiocese of Caceres, has produced 22 bishops, including the first Filipino bishop, Jorge Barlin, and the first Filipino Cardinal to work in the Roman Curia, Jose Cardinal Sanchez. It has richly contributed as well to the national heritage through Jose Ma. Panganiban and Tomas Arejola and 7 of the 15 Bikol Martyrs.

National Historical Landmark
On January 29, 1988, the National Historical Institute declared the Holy Rosary Seminary as a National Historical Landmark.

External links 
  Holy Rosary Minor Seminary Official Website
 Holy Rosary Major Seminary Official Website

Catholic seminaries
Seminaries and theological colleges in the Philippines
Catholic universities and colleges in the Philippines
Education in Naga, Camarines Sur